Rick Lee Guttormson (リック・ガトームソン, 릭 구톰슨) (born January 11, 1977) is a former professional baseball starting pitcher.

He became the first pitcher to throw a no-hitter in the history of interleague play in Japanese baseball, doing so against the Tohoku Rakuten Golden Eagles on May 25, . As of the 2022, he became the last foreign pitcher to throw a no hitter in Nippon Professional Baseball until 2022, when Cody Ponce of the Hokkaido Nippon-Ham Fighters did so against the Fukuoka SoftBank Hawks on the 27th of August.

References

External links

Career statistics and player information from Korea Baseball Organization

1977 births
Living people
American expatriate baseball players in Japan
Yakult Swallows players
Tokyo Yakult Swallows players
Fukuoka SoftBank Hawks players
Kia Tigers players
KBO League pitchers
American expatriate baseball players in South Korea
Baseball players from California
Major League Baseball pitchers